James Auchmuty was an Irish dean in the middle of the 18th century.

A former Dean of Emly, Auchmuty was Dean of Armagh from 1736 until 1753.

References

Irish Anglicans
Deans of Emly
Deans of Armagh